is a Japanese professional baseball player for the Tohoku Rakuten Golden Eagles of the Nippon Professional Baseball (NPB).

His wife is a Japanese actress Anna Ishibashi.

Career

Amateur career
As a pitcher for Toko Gakuen high school, he won a 7–0 victory against Imabari-Nishi high school where he racked up 22 strikeouts. Later on, he struck out 19 batters at Koshien Stadium and won a 7–5 game over Joso Gakuin. He also struck out the same amount in 2005, which ranked him along with Yoshinori Toda in 1963.

Tohoku Rakuten Golden Eagles
In October 2013, he was selected by five teams in the 2013 Nippon Professional Baseball draft, with the Tohoku Rakuten Golden Eagles winning the rights to negotiate with him. On April 2, 2014 his team scored 7–1 against Orix Buffaloes even though he made only three runs.

Matsui is a 5 ft 9 in, 163 lb left-handed pitcher. With an overhand delivery he throws a high-80s fastball (tops out at 93 mph), a change-up, an occasional curveball, and a solid slider around 80 mph, which is his best pitch. He mostly uses his fastball-slider combination in games.

International career
He was selected Japan national baseball team at the 2013 18U Baseball World Cup, 2015 exhibition games against Europe, 2015 WBSC Premier12, 2017 World Baseball Classic and 2018 MLB Japan All-Star Series.

On October 10, 2018, he was selected at the 2018 MLB Japan All-Star Series.

On October 1, 2019, he was selected at the 2019 WBSC Premier12. But, on October 21, he canceled due to left elbow discomfort.

References

External links
Yuki Matsui on a JapanBall Blog

1995 births
Living people
Baseball people from Yokohama
Japanese baseball players
Nippon Professional Baseball pitchers
Tohoku Rakuten Golden Eagles players
2015 WBSC Premier12 players
2017 World Baseball Classic players
2023 World Baseball Classic players